Humboldt City, Nevada is a former mining settlement whose ruins lie in Pershing County approximately 10 miles SW of Mill City and 2 miles SE of Interstate 80.

There was a Post Office in operation from April 1862 until November 1869.

References

External links 
  - letters from Humboldt City
  - photos

Ghost towns in Pershing County, Nevada